Ashchebutak is a former air base in Russia located 40 km southeast of Novoorsk. It is an abandoned airfield; no buildings; and may have been abandoned in the 1970s.

References

RussianAirFields.com

Soviet Air Force bases